Eila is a 2003 Finnish drama film directed by Jarmo Lampela. It was entered into the 25th Moscow International Film Festival.

Cast
 Sari Mällinen as Eila Salonen
 Ilkka Koivula as Timo
 Hannes Suominen as Mika
 Kristiina Halkola as Pirkko Karvinen
 Johanna Kerttula as Mari Lainio
 Kari Hietalahti as Kai Pylkkänen
 Aino Lehtimäki as Laina
 Irja Matikainen as Laskupää
 Juha Muje as Sauli Korpivuori
 Elina Hietala as Jonna
 Hannu-Pekka Björkman as Eero

References

External links
 

2003 films
2003 drama films
Finnish drama films
2000s Finnish-language films